Henry de Rosenbach Walker (30 May 1867 – 31 July 1923) was a British Liberal Party politician and author.

Background
He was a son of R. F. Walker of Shooter's Hill, Kent and Marie von Rosenbach, of Karritz, Estonia. He was educated at Winchester School and Trinity College, Cambridge. In 1900 he married Maud Eleanor Chute, of Basingstoke. They had three daughters.

Career
He worked as a clerk in the Foreign Office from 1889 to 1892. He travelled extensively in Russia, Central Asia, the Far East, North America, the West Indies, and the Antipodes. From his travels he had two books published; Australasian Democracy in 1897 and The West Indies and the Empire in 1901. He stood as a Liberal candidate for parliament on four occasions. First he contested a Liberal seat, the Stowmarket division of Suffolk in 1895, losing to the Conservatives. He then contested the marginal dual member seat of Plymouth in 1900 and finished in fourth place. He was then elected Liberal MP for the Melton Division of Leicestershire in 1906, gaining the seat from the Conservatives.

This was the first occasion that Melton had been won by a Liberal since it was created in 1885. He successfully defended Melton at the General Election of January 1910 by a majority of just 123 votes. However, he chose not to defend his seat at the December 1910 General Election. He did not stand for parliament again. He was elected to the London County Council as a Liberal Party backed Progressive candidate for St Pancras East in 1913. He was made a Member of the London War Pensions Committee in 1916. He served one full term as a Councillor until he was appointed an Alderman in 1919. He served as an Alderman until his death. In 1914 he had published The Need for the Parliament Act.

Sources
Who Was Who
British parliamentary election results 1885–1918, Craig, F. W. S.

References

External links
 
 
 Who Was Who; http://www.ukwhoswho.com

1867 births
1923 deaths
Liberal Party (UK) MPs for English constituencies
UK MPs 1906–1910
UK MPs 1910
Members of London County Council
Progressive Party (London) politicians
British people of German descent